Louis Ferreira (born Luís Ferreira; born 20 February 1966) is a Canadian actor. Ferreira is known for his roles in Stargate Universe as Colonel Everett Young, serial killer Ray Prager in the first season of Durham County, FBI Assistant Director John Pollock in Missing, and Art Blank in Saw IV, Saw V, and Saw 3D. He starred in the CTV series Motive as homicide detective Oscar Vega. Before 2008, he was credited under the stage name Justin Louis.

Early life 
Ferreira was born on 20 February 1966, in Terceira, Azores, and immigrated with his parents to Canada early in his life. He grew up in the Jane and Finch neighbourhood in North York, Ontario.

The actor went by the stage name Justin Louis for 25 years until his Portuguese-born mother died in 2008, after which he decided to use his family name and "Louis", an approximation of his given name, "Luís".

Career 
Ferreira's résumé includes over 100 onscreen credits, as he has appeared on a broad range of television shows, including lead roles in Hidden Hills, Durham County, Urban Angel, Missing, and Bad Blood. He has also played recurring or guest roles in various TV shows, including: NCIS, CSI: Crime Scene Investigation, and Criminal Minds. After playing the recurring roles of Declan in season five of Breaking Bad, and Colonel Henderson Hall in Primeval: New World. He also starred in the CTV series Motive as homicide detective Oscar Vega, with recurring roles in The Romeo Section, and This Life. He also hosted the television series Letters to God.

In 2009, Ferreira was featured as David Maysles in the HBO award-winning film Grey Gardens opposite Jessica Lange and Drew Barrymore. Other film credits include portraying Sarah Polley's husband in Dawn of the Dead, as well as roles in Shooter, and The Lazarus Child. Ferreira played the role of Earl in the 1995 film Blood and Donuts and appeared in the 2007 film Saw IV. Further credits include The Marsh, Boozecan, and The Big Slice. He also portrayed Donald Trump in Trump Unauthorized, and was a lead in the miniseries The Andromeda Strain.

In 2010, he became known as FBI Swat Sergeant Brian in The Town filming in Los Angeles, California.

In 2011, he became known as "The Voice of Mazda", voicing a series of commercials for their national campaign for two years. Other voice-over work includes Police Officer Vince in the TV series The Dating Guy, and Chet in the episode "Hyde and Go Shriek" in the animated children's series Tales from the Cryptkeeper.

In 2017, he became part of the reboot S.W.A.T. with Shemar Moore. He plays the character Team Leader Sergeant Buck Spivey.

Awards 
Ferreira won the Best Actor Award for his portrayal of Robert (Duke) Romano in Fallen Arches at the Chicago Alt.Film Fest in 1999. In 2008, he won the Gemini Award for Best Performance by an Actor in a Continuing Leading Dramatic Role for his work portraying the serial killer Ray Prager in Durham County. He was nominated for the same award in 2010 for the role of Colonel Everett Young in the TV series Stargate Universe. He won the Leo Award for Best Lead Performance by a Male in a Dramatic Series in 2014 and 2015. He was nominated for the same Leo Award in 2016.

Filmography

Film

Television

Video games

References

External links 
 
 The Friends of Louis Ferreira - The Official Louis Ferreira Website

1966 births
Living people
Canadian male film actors
Canadian people of Azorean descent
Canadian male television actors
Canadian male voice actors
People from North York
Portuguese emigrants to Canada
Portuguese expatriates in Canada
20th-century Portuguese male actors
21st-century Portuguese male actors
Male actors from Toronto
Best Actor in a Drama Series Canadian Screen Award winners
Canadian people of Portuguese descent